Birendra Shah (Unknown – November 8, 2007) was a print and broadcast journalist for the Nepal FM, Dristi Weekly, and Avenues TV  in Bara, Nepal. Shah was kidnapped October 4/5, 2007, by Communist Party of Nepal Maoists from Pipara Bazaar, Kalaiya, Bara, Nepal, and found dead one month later. The CPN(M) later issued a statement confirming his death.

Personal 
Married to Umarawati Devi with two children.

Death 
Shah was kidnapped after exposing the Maoists and connections to illegal logging deals. Three members of the Maoists abducted Shah, took him to a forest, and then shot him to death same day he was kidnapped.

Context 
Shah exposed illegal logging deals related to the Maoists. Before his death, he had written several reports about the Maoists which resulted in many threats from the party. They abducted and killed him the same day in a forest and threw his body in a swampy forest. Members of Maoist first denied the abduction and killing of the journalist but then after a month admitted to the killing. The abduction and killing was part of a "personal vendetta".

Impact 
Shah has been given a television journalism award in his memory from Avenues Television production.

Reactions 
His death drew criticism from several press freedom organizations, including Reporters Without Borders, the Committee to Protect Journalists, and the International Federation of Journalists. There were multiple calls for justice and a nationwide protest.

More than a month after the killing, Maoist Deputy Commander Janardan Sharma Prabhakar apologized on behalf of his party, which had previously claimed innocence.

See also
List of kidnappings
List of solved missing person cases

References 

2000s missing person cases
2007 deaths
Assassinated Nepalese journalists
Civilians killed in the Nepalese Civil War
Kidnappings in Nepal
Male murder victims
Missing person cases in Nepal
People murdered in Nepal
Year of birth missing